A kiss is a touch with the lips, usually to express love or affection, or as part of a greeting.

Kiss, Kisses, KISS, or K.I.S.S. may also refer to:

Books
Kiss (comics), any of several comics featuring the rock band
Kiss (Irish magazine), for teens
Kiss (Japanese magazine), a manga magazine
Kiss (Wilson novel), a 2007 young adult novel
Kiss (Dekker novel), 2009
Kiss Trilogy, a series of novels by Debbie Viguié

Organisations
Keep It Straight and Simple Party, a minor political party in South Africa
KISS NB, a minor political party in the Canadian province of New Brunswick
Kiss Baking Company Limited, in Trinidad
KISS (brand), a brand from a Japanese adult video game company

Computing
KISS (TNC), a protocol used with amateur radio terminal node controllers
Kiss Technology, a Danish entertainment technology company
Kisekae Set System (KiSS), software for blending art and computers
KISS (algorithm), a family of pseudo-random number generators
Kissing number (in math, number of non overlapping spheres touching one other sphere)

Film and television
Kiss (1963 film), directed by Andy Warhol
Kiss (2013 film), a Telugu romantic comedy directed by Adivi Sesh
Kiss (2019 film), a Kannada film directed by A. P. Arjun
Kisses (2008 film), an Irish drama directed by Lance Daly
Kisses (1922 film), an American silent comedy film 
Kiss: The Series, a 2016 Thai television series
Kiss TV, a UK music channel

Music

Bands
Kiss (band), an American hard rock/heavy metal group
Kiss (South Korean group), a female pop trio
Kisses (band), a duo from Los Angeles, California

Albums
Kiss (Kiss album), 1974
Kiss (Bad Boys Blue album)
Kiss, a 2000 album by Les Wampas
Kiss (L'Arc-en-Ciel album), 2007
K.I.S.S. (Keep It Sexy & Simple), a 2011 studio album by Mýa
Kiss (Carly Rae Jepsen album), 2012
Kisses (album), 2019, by Anitta
K.I.S.S, 2020, by twlv

EPs
Kiss (The Orb EP), 1989
Kiss (London After Midnight EP), 1995
Kiss (Versailles EP), 2003
Kiss (Chara EP), 2008

Songs and music pieces

"Kiss", a 1953 Dean Martin song
"Kiss" (Prince song), 1986
"Kiss" (Princess Princess song), 1991
"Kiss (When the Sun Don't Shine)", by the Vengaboys, 1999
"Kiss" (Mai Kuraki song), 2003
"Kiss" (Korn song), 2008
"Kiss" (Dara song), 2009
Kuss-Walzer, or "Kiss Waltz", composed by Johann Strauss II

Other media
Kiss: Psycho Circus: The Nightmare Child, a 2000 first-person shooter
Kiss FM (disambiguation), any of several radio stations
Kiss Network, a UK radio network

Products
Kisses (confectionery), in Britain and North America, various items of small confectionery
 Hershey's Kisses, a chocolate candy
Kiss, a line of consumer-level Canon EOS cameras in the Japanese market since 1993

Transportation
Celier Kiss, a Polish gyroplane
Stadler KISS, a train

University
Kalinga Institute of Social Sciences, Odisha based Exclusive Tribal University.

Other uses
Kiss (surname)
DJ Kiss, American DJ, television personality, and fashion model
Kisses Delavin (born 1999), Filipina actress and singer
Kiss, a term used in cue sports
KISS principle, or "Keep it simple, stupid", the concept that most systems work better when kept simple
Kiss, a Brazilian nightclub destroyed in the Kiss nightclub fire
Kiss (pinball)
Kiss II, a 1962 pop art painting by Roy Lichtenstein
Kiss (cryptanalysis), in World War II codebreaking
KISS 5, 2020 album by K Camp

See also
The Kiss (disambiguation)
Kiss You (disambiguation)
Kiss Me (disambiguation)
Kissin (disambiguation)
Kisspeptin or KISS1, a human gene